National Highway 332A, commonly referred to as NH 332A is a national highway in India. It is a secondary route of National Highway 32.  NH-332A runs in the state of Tamil Nadu in India.

Route 
NH332A connects Puducherry and Mamallapuram in the state of Tamil Nadu.

Junctions 

  Terminal near Puducherry.

See also 
 List of National Highways in India
 List of National Highways in India by state

References

External links 

 NH 332A on OpenStreetMap

National highways in India
National Highways in Tamil Nadu